Baboo was a seminal 1990s Taiwan rock band led by singer Lin Hui-che (:zh:林暐哲) and keyboardist Lee Cincin (:zh:李欣芸). They issued the album entitled New Taiwan Dollar (Chinese: 新臺幣) in 1992 and contributed to the Dust of Angels film soundtrack. Lin Hui-che went on to become a producer.

References

Taiwanese rock music groups